The Shvetsov ASh-21 is a seven-cylinder single-row air-cooled radial aero engine.

Design and development
The ASh-21 is basically a single-row version of the Shvetsov ASh-82.  The ASh-21 also incorporates a number of parts from the ASh-62 radial engine. Design began in 1945, and by 1947 testing had finished and production had begun.  Between 1947 and 1955 7,636 ASh-21 engines had been built in the USSR and beginning in 1952 it was produced in Czechoslovakia as the M-21.

Applications
 Beriev Be-8
 Beriev Be-30 (prototype)
 Yakovlev Yak-11
 Yakovlev Yak-16

Specifications (Shvetsov ASh-21)

See also

References

 
 

1940s aircraft piston engines
Aircraft air-cooled radial piston engines
Shvetsov aircraft engines